Acritini is a tribe of clown beetles in the family Histeridae. There are about 12 genera and at least 250 described species in Acritini.

Genera
 Abaeletes Cooman, 1940
 Acritodes Cooman, 1935
 Acritus J. L. LeConte, 1853
 Aeletes Horn, 1873
 Aeletodes Gomy, 1977
 Anophtaeletes Olexa, 1976
 Arizonacritus Gomy & Warner, 2013
 Halacritus Schmidt, 1893
 Iberacritus Yélamos, 1994
 Mascarenium Gomy, 1978
 Spelaeacritus Jeannel, 1934
 Therondus Gomy, 1974

References

 Mazur, Slawomir (1997). "A world catalogue of the Histeridae (Coleoptera: Histeroidea)". Genus, International Journal of Invertebrate Taxonomy (Supplement), 373.

Further reading

 Arnett, R. H. Jr., M. C. Thomas, P. E. Skelley and J. H. Frank. (eds.). (21 June 2002). American Beetles, Volume II: Polyphaga: Scarabaeoidea through Curculionoidea. CRC Press LLC, Boca Raton, Florida .
 Arnett, Ross H. (2000). American Insects: A Handbook of the Insects of America North of Mexico. CRC Press.
 Richard E. White. (1983). Peterson Field Guides: Beetles. Houghton Mifflin Company.

External links

 NCBI Taxonomy Browser, Acritini

Histeridae
Polyphaga tribes